Meragisa nicolasi is a moth of the family Notodontidae. It is found in northern Peru.

References

Moths described in 1939
Notodontidae